Ottó Károlyi (born in Paris, and with a Hungarian background), having studied in Budapest, Vienna, and London, was a musicologist and the Senior Lecturer of Music at the University of Stirling, Scotland, where he founded the Music department and remained employed even after the department's closure. He died in October 2016.

Personal life
Károlyi married Heather Goodare in 1957; they had a son, born in 1971 but the marriage broke up.

Bibliography
(1965). Introducing Music. .
(1980). Musik. Ein Führer zum besseren Verstehen (Music. A guide for better understanding)  .
(1994). Modern British Music: The Second British Musical Renaissance--From Elgar to P. Maxwell Davies. .
(1995). Introducing Modern Music .
(1996). Modern American Music--From Charles Ives to the Minimalists. .
(1999). Traditional African And Oriental Music .
(2000). La grammatica della musica (The grammar of music) .
(2005). Introducción a la música del siglo XX (Introduction to music of the 20th Century) .

Sources

Academics of the University of Stirling
Living people
Hungarian musicologists
Academics from Paris
Year of birth missing (living people)
French musicologists